Toma Group is one of the leading  Bangladeshi construction conglomerate based in Dhaka which specializes in government contracts. Mohammad Ataur Rahman Bhuiyan (Manik) is the chairperson of Toma Group. Mohammad Ataur Rahman Bhuiya is the Vice-President of the Noakhali District unit of Awami League.

History 
Toma Group was established in 1996 with the start of Toma Construction & Co. Limited. It is one of two exclusive contractors of Bangladesh Railway, the other is Max Group.

Toma Group established Toma Properties Limited in 2006.

Public Works Department awarded a contract to Toma Group to build health care facilities, a asthma centre and a diabetic hospital, in Bogra District in 2007 for 110 million taka. The project did not start as of 2011 because the Ministry of Health and Family Welfare did not proceed with the project.

Toma construction delayed the construction of a culvert in Hatirjheel project by three months after they subcontracted the project in 2011. The had received the contract from Bangladesh Railway. It had received a contact for the construction of Raimoni-Mymensingh 27 kilometre road for 2.66 billion taka. It had received the contract in partnership with Shamim Enterprise Limited and China Metallurgical Group Corporation.

Bangladesh High Court issued arrest warrant against the governing body head of Siddheswari Boys School and College, Showeb Chowdhury Tapan, on 6 February 2014 after he had rented out the playground of the school to Toma Group. They were using the playground to store construction materials for the Moghbazar flyover. A petition was filed challenging the lease by president of the Siddheswari Home Owners Association challenging the legality of the lease. In April 2014, Toma group started Taxi service in Dhaka along with Trust Transport Services of Army Welfare Trust. The taxis were inaugurated by Prime Minister Sheikh Hasina. In 2014, it signed an agreement with Bashundhara Group to only use their cement in its construction works.

Cabinet Committee on Public Purchase awarded Toma Construction a contract to build 8 buildings in Uttara sector-18 for 3.56 billion taka on 26 March 2015.

A construction worker of Toma Group died while constructing the Mouchak-Moghbazar flyover in March 2017. Bdnews24.com reported that the workers at the construction site lacked adequate safety gear. Bangladesh High Court issued a ruling, on a petition filed by Children's Charity Foundation of Bangladesh on behalf of the injured and dead workers, asking Toma Group why it should be not directed to provide 3 and 5 million taka compensation to the two injured and one dead victim.

In July 2020, Anti-Corruption Commission questioned Toma Construction Limited over the supply of fake N95 respirator masks during the COVID-19 pandemic in Bangladesh.

On 30 December 2020, Department of Environment fined Toma Construction 500 million taka for illegally cutting hills in Lohagara Upazila in Chittagong District. The hills were located inside Chunati Wildlife Sanctuary and were cut in October 2020 as part of the construction of Dohazari-Cox's Bazar railway track. The Director of the Department of Environment stated that they intend to file a case with the environmental court over the incident.

Businesses 

 Toma Concrete Limited
 Toma Construction
 Toma Properties

See also 

 Golden Harvest Group
 Impress Group

References 

1996 establishments in Bangladesh
Organisations based in Dhaka
Conglomerate companies of Bangladesh